St Martin, Ludgate, also known as St Martin within Ludgate, is an Anglican church on Ludgate Hill in the ward of Farringdon, in the City of London. The church is of medieval origin, but the present building dates from 1677 to 1684 and was designed by Sir Christopher Wren.

History
Some legends connect the church with legendary King Cadwallo (now usually referred to as Cadwallon ap Cadfan, father of Cadwaladr. A sign on the front of the church reads "Cadwallo King of the Britons is said to have been buried here in 677". Modern historians would place his death about 682. Cadwallo's image was allegedly placed on Ludgate, to frighten away the Saxons. However, Middlesex and the London area were controlled by the Anglo-Saxon polities at that time and there is no evidence of British or any other occupation of the intramural area of the abandoned 'Londinium' since the late fourth century. Previously the sign stated that it was the West Saxon king Caedwalla but this was contradicted by Bede's writings that he was buried in Rome. However the earliest written reference is from 1174. A Blackfriars monastery was built nearby in 1278. The church was rebuilt in 1437 and the tower was struck by lightning in 1561. The parish books start from 1410. Before the Reformation, the church was under the control of Westminster Abbey, and afterwards under St. Paul's Cathedral.

St Martin of Tours is a Patron Saint of travellers. Churches which are dedicated to him often stand just within city gates. A blue plaque next to church records the earlier presence of Ludgate, demolished 1760.   The church consists of a lead-clad dome, topped by a lantern and on top of that a sharp obelisk steeple. From the lower part of Fleet Street the steeple stands between the viewer and the dome of St Paul's Cathedral. Wren probably planned to make a contrast between the spiky steeple of St Martin's and the circular dome of St Paul's.

In "The Roaring Girl, or Moll Cutpurse" by Dekker and Middleton, Sebastian says "The clock at Ludgate, sir, it ne'er goes true". This might refer to St Martin's church. "I owe you three farthings, say the bells of St Martin", might refer to this church, but is more likely to refer to St Martin Orgar in Cannon Street (previously Eastcheap). In 1614 Samuel Purchas, a travel writer, became the rector. On the 17th century font there is a Greek palindrome – ΝΙΨΟΝ ΑΝΟΜΗΜΑΤΑ ΜΗ ΜΟΝΑΝ ΟΨΙΝ Nipson anomemata me monan opsin (Cleanse my sin and not my face only). There is a 17th-century carved oak double churchwarden's chair – the only one of its kind known to exist.

The medieval church was repaired in 1623, only to be destroyed in the Great Fire of London in 1666. Rebuilding was not immediate, but was largely completed by 1680, finished in 1703. In 1669 a Roman tombstone, now in the Ashmolean Museum, was found. The centre of the church is in the form of a Greek cross, with four large columns. The chandelier dates from about 1777 and comes from the West Indies. As a curiosity, this is from the burial register: "“1615, February 28, St. Martin’s, Ludgate, was buried an anatomy from the College of Physicians.” (It was first noticed by Andrew Lang, in an article in "Books and Bookmen"). The Royal College of Physicians were based in Amen Corner, a few yards away from 1614 to 1666. In 1678 Robert Hooke designed a new hall in Warwick Lane, also nearby.

The view from the steeple towards the river is spectacular. It was painted by T.M. Baynes.

In 1893 to 1894, the church underwent a major rebuilding and alteration, with the floor level raised, and many bodies disinterred from the churchyard and reburied at Brookwood Cemetery.

In 1941, during the London Blitz, a German incendiary bomb damaged the roof, but St Martin's received relatively little damage during the Second World War. In 1954 St Martin's became a Guild Church and was designated a Grade I listed building on 4 January 1950.

Organ

The organ is a Bernard Schmidt design dating from 1684. There are carvings by Grinling Gibbons inside. The contemporary carvings in the church are also attributed to three joiners, Athew, Draper and Poulden, and to the carvers Cooper and William Newman. There are organ recitals every other Monday; chamber music every Wednesday and Friday.

A specification of the organ can be found on the National Pipe Organ Register.

Past organists at St Martin include:
Frederick Albert Bridge (b. 1841 – d. 1917)

See also

 List of churches and cathedrals of London
 List of Christopher Wren churches in London

Notes

External links

St Martin's-within-Ludgate website
photograph
Cadwallo – Cadwallader
Looking At buildings
Greek Palindrome
The 1615 Anatomy
Roman inscription
Live Music
View from the steeple
360° panorama inside St Martin's-within-Ludgate

Christopher Wren church buildings in London
Churches completed in 1684
17th-century Church of England church buildings
English Baroque church buildings
Church of England church buildings in the City of London
Grade I listed churches in the City of London
Rebuilt churches in the United Kingdom
Diocese of London
1684 establishments in England
Ewan Christian buildings